John Meyer (February 27, 1852 – July 3, 1895) was an American lawyer and politician.

Meyer was born in the Netherlands. He emigrated to the United States with his parents in 1867 and settled in Chicago, Illinois. He went to the public schools in Chicago. He studied law at Northwestern University Pritzker School of Law. He received his law degree in 1879 and was admitted to the Illinois bar. Meyer practiced law in Freeport, Illinois with his brother-in-law. Meyer served in the Illinois House of Representatives from 1884 until his death in 1895. He served as speaker of the house in 1895 and was a Republican. Meyer died at his brother-in-law's home in Freeport, Illinois.

Notes

External links

1852 births
1895 deaths
Dutch emigrants to the United States
People from Freeport, Illinois
Northwestern University Pritzker School of Law alumni
Lawyers from Chicago
Republican Party members of the Illinois House of Representatives
Speakers of the Illinois House of Representatives
19th-century American politicians
19th-century American lawyers